Drumballyhagan and Drumballyhagan Clark are two townlands lying within the civil parish of Kilcronaghan, County Londonderry, Northern Ireland. Situated in the north of the parish, the two townlands are separated by the Moyola River, of which the southern portion was held by a person surnamed "Clark". Together they are bounded by the townlands of; Ballynahone Beg, Bracaghreilly, Drumcrow, Fallagloon, Lisnamuck, Moneyshanere, and Tobermore. It was apportioned to the Vintners company.

The townland was part of Tobermore electoral ward of the former Magherafelt District Council, however in 1926 it was part of Tobermore district electoral division as part of the Maghera division of Magherafelt Rural District. It was also part of the historic barony of Loughinsholin.

Etymology
This townland derives its name from the O'Hagan's, one of the principal Irish families in the barony of Loughinsholin. They occupied a castle in the nearby townland of Calmore and the surname was common in the neighbouring parishes of Desertmartin and Ballynascreen.

History
Table legend
 (D) - Drumballyhagan
 (DC) - Drumballyhagan Clarke

See also
Kilcronaghan
List of townlands in Tobermore
Tobermore

References

Townlands of County Londonderry
Civil parish of Kilcronaghan